Alwiya Gamil was an Egyptian actress of Lebanese origin whose real name was Elisabeth Khalil Majdalani. She was born in Lebanon on December 15, 1910 and immigrated with her parents to Egypt.

Career
Gamil began her career at the age of 15 when she joined Youssef Wahbi's performing group Ramesses in 1925. It is believed that Wahbi gave her the stage name. Gamil is known for her leading roles in Zeinab (1930), Victory of Youth (1941), and No Agreement (1961) The Cursed Palace (1962).  She retired in 1967.

Personal life
Gamil married twice. Her second marriage was in 1939 to the Egyptian actor, Mahmoud el-Meliguy. They did not have children but raised her three children from her first marriage together. Gamil died on August 16, 1994.

See also 
 Lists of Egyptians

References

External links

1910 births
1994 deaths
Egyptian film actresses
20th-century Egyptian actresses
Place of birth missing
Lebanese emigrants to Egypt